Real may refer to:

Currencies
 Brazilian real (R$)
 Central American Republic real
 Mexican real
 Portuguese real
 Spanish real
 Spanish colonial real

Music

Albums
 Real (L'Arc-en-Ciel album) (2000)
 Real (Bright album) (2010)
 Real (Belinda Carlisle album) (1993)
 Real (Gorgon City EP) (2013)
 Real (IU EP) (2010)
 Real (Ivy Queen album) (2004)
 Real (Mika Nakashima album) (2013)
 Real (Ednita Nazario album) (2007)
 Real (Jodie Resther album), a 2000 album by Jodie Resther
 Real (Michael Sweet album) (1995)
 Real (The Word Alive album) (2014)
 Real, a 2002 album by Israel Houghton recording as Israel & New Breed

Songs
 "Real" (Goo Goo Dolls song) (2008)
 "Real" (Gorgon City song) (2013)
 "Real" (Plumb song) (2004)
 "Real" (Vivid song) (2012)
 "Real" (James Wesley song) (2010)
 "Real", a song by Kendrick Lamar from Good Kid, M.A.A.D City
 "Real", a song by NF from Therapy Session
 "Real", a song by the Verve Pipe from Villains
 "Real", a song by Years & Years from Communion

Other media
 Real (manga), a manga series by Takehiko Inoue
 Real (TV channel), a Hindi entertainment channel
 RealNetworks, an Internet media provider
 Real, a member of the band F.I.R.
 Ahmad Givens or Real, a central figure in the reality television series Real Chance of Love
 Real (2013 film), a Japanese film
 Real (2017 film), a South Korean film

Places
 Réal, a commune in southern France
 Real de Catorce, a village in the Mexican state of San Luis Potosí
 Real, Quezon, a municipality in the Philippines
 Real, Dume e Semelhe, a parish in Braga, Portugal
 Ciudad Real, a municipality of province of Ciudad Real in the Castile–La Mancha, Spain
 Real, Valencia, a municipality of province of Valencia in the Valencian Community
 Real County, Texas, a county in the United States
 Real (Ponce), a barrio in Ponce, Puerto Rico

Sports

Africa
Real Republicans FC (Accra), Ghana
Real Republicans F.C. (Sierra Leone)

Central and South America
Club Real Potosí, Bolivia
Municipal Real Mamoré, Bolivia
Associação Esportiva Real, Brazil
Real Noroeste Capixaba Futebol Clube, Brazil
C.D. Real Sociedad, Honduras
Real C.D. España, Honduras
Real Maya, Honduras
Real Club España, Mexico
Real Saltillo Soccer, Mexico
Real Sociedad de Zacatecas, Mexico
Real Estelí Baloncesto, Nicaragua
Real Estelí F.C., Nicaragua
Real Madriz, Nicaragua
Real Garcilaso, Peru

Portugal
Real Sport Clube
Vila Real

Spain
Real Madrid CF, a multi-sports club whose football section is most commonly associated with the title
Real Aranjuez CF
Real Ávila CF
Real Avilés CF
Real Balompédica Linense
Real Betis
Real Burgos CF
Real Club Celta de Vigo
Real Club Deportivo Carabanchel
Real Club Deportivo Córdoba (defunct)
Reial Club Deportiu Espanyol de Barcelona
Real Club Deportivo de La Coruña
Real Club Deportivo Mallorca
Real Club Recreativo de Huelva
Real Jaén CF
Real Murcia CF
Real Oviedo
Real Racing Club de Santander
Real Sociedad
Real Sociedad Deportiva Alcalá
Real Sociedad Gimnástica de Torrelavega
Real Sporting de Gijón
Real Tapia CF
Real Titánico
Real Unión
Real Valladolid CF
Real Zaragoza

United States
Real Colorado Cougars
Real Colorado Foxes
Real Maryland F.C.
Real Salt Lake, Utah
Real San Jose, California
Real Shore F.C., New Jersey

Other uses
 Reality, the state of things as they exist, rather than as they may appear or may be thought to be
 Real numbers, the set of rational and irrational numbers (and opposed to imaginary numbers)
 Real (galley), the flagship of Don Juan de Austria
 Real (hypermarket), a European hypermarket
 Real (supermarket), a Paraguayan supermarket chain 
 The Real, an aspect of human psychic structure
 Real (residence), a recreation residence in Xarq Al-Andalus
 Real Crisps, a brand of potato crisp manufactured in Newport, Wales, United Kingdom
 Real Transportes Aéreos, a former Brazilian airline
 Convento de San Felipe el Real, a former convent in Madrid
 Republican Alternative Party (Azerbaijan), also known as ReAl Party, a political party in Azerbaijan
 Réseau Express de l'Aire urbaine Lyonnaise, the name of the railroads in Lyon's agglomeration
 the Revised European-American Lymphoma classification (REAL), for diagnosis
 Real, a motorcycle constructed by Manfred Herweh

People with the surname
 Manuel Real (1924–2019), United States judge

See also 
 Cambodian riel, currency of Cambodia
 Inflation-adjusted amounts
 List of parishes of Portugal
 REAL ID Act, a U.S. federal law
 Real versus nominal value (economics)
 Reale, a surname
 Really (disambiguation)
 Rhéal, given name
 Rial (disambiguation)
 Riyal (disambiguation)